Catocala californiensis is a moth of the family Erebidae. It is found in southern California.

Adults are on wing from June to July. There is probably one generation per year.

The larvae feed on Quercus turbinella.

References

External links
Species info

californiensis
Fauna of the California chaparral and woodlands
Endemic fauna of California
Moths described in 1976
Moths of North America
Fauna without expected TNC conservation status